Leucorhynchia crossei is a species of sea snail, a marine gastropod mollusk in the family Skeneidae.

Description
The diameter of the shell is 3 mm. It differs from the Leucorhynchia caledonica in having a rounded periphery. The surface is polished, without a trace of striae.

Distribution
This marine species occurs in the Red Sea, the Gulf of Oman, Central and East Indian Ocean, Indo-Malaysia, Singapore, Western Australia and off Korea

References

 Melvill, J.C., 1906. A revision of the species of Cyclostrematidae and Liotiidae occurring in the Persian Gulf and North Arabian Sea. Proceedings of the Malacological Society of London 7:20-283, 20-28, plate 3.
 Ladd, H.S. (1966). Chitons and gastropods (Haliotidae through Adeorbidae) from the western Pacific Islands. United States Geological Survey, Professional Paper. 531 : 1-98 16 pls
 Trew, A., 1984. The Melvill-Tomlin Collection. Part 30. Trochacea. Handlists of the Molluscan Collections in the Department of Zoology, National Museum of Wales.
 Higo, S., Callomon, P. & Goto, Y. (1999) Catalogue and Bibliography of the Marine Shell-Bearing Mollusca of Japan. Elle Scientific Publications, Yao, Japan, 749 pp

External links
 To World Register of Marine Species
 

crossei
Gastropods described in 1888